Sextuple metre (Am. meter) or sextuple time (chiefly British) is a musical metre characterized by six beats in a measure. Like the more common duple, triple, and quadruple metres, it may be simple, with each beat divided in half, or compound, with each beat divided into thirds. It may, for example, be used to indicate a bar of triple metre in which each beat is subdivided into six parts. In this case, the metre is sometimes characterized as "triple sextuple time". Using  for both hands would result in continuous sextuplets.

Sextuple metre should not be confused with the similarly notated compound duple metre. While both are notated with time signatures that have 6 as the top number, the former has six beats to a bar, while the latter has two beats to a bar. When  is used to signify sextuple metre, often the words "in six" or the equivalent in other languages are used to clarify the metre. An example of a piece in true sextuple time is Charles-Valentin Alkan's Barcarolette in E minor, No. 12 of his 49 Esquisses, which is in compound sextuple time.

See also
 Metre (hymn)
 Metre (poetry)
 Triple metre
 Duple and quadruple metre
 Composite rhythm
 Counting (music)

References

 Bach, Johann Sebastian. 1968. The Musical Offering [and] The "Goldberg Variations". Kalmus Study Scores no. 720. [N.p.]: Edwin F. Kalmus, Publisher of Music. Reprinted Melville, NY: Belwin Mills Publishing Corp.
 Read, Gardner. 1964. Music Notation: A Manual of Modern Practice. Boston: Allyn and Bacon, Inc.

European rhythm
Time signatures